MSDSonline is a private company that creates programs designed to organize material safety data sheets for other businesses.

Overview
The company was founded in 1996 and is based in Chicago, Illinois. MSDSonline is a Material Safety Data Sheet Supplier. The company develops products for MSDS management and compliance, illness and injury  record keeping, workplace safety training, environmental health and safety professional regulatory assistance and personal protective equipment. MSDSonline also informs about outsourced MSDS management, MSDS library building and MSDS indexing.  MSDSonline also creates items associated with meeting the compliance requirements established by Occupational Safety and Health Administration, United States Environmental Protection Agency, United States Department of Transportation, Workplace Hazardous Materials Information System, the Joint Commission (JCAHO) and various other regulatory organizations. MSDSonline, Inc. operates as a subsidiary of Automated Document Exchange Services Inc.

Environmental health & safety solutions
 MSDS Management & Compliance
 Injury & Illness Recordkeeping
 Workplace Safety Training
 EH&S Regulatory Assistance
 Personal Protection Equipment

Environmental health & safety services
 MSDS Fax-Back Services 
 Chemical Inventory Audits
 MSDS Library Building
 Outsourced MSDS Management
 MSDS Indexing
 Regulatory Cross Referencing

References

Companies based in Chicago
Companies established in 1996
Privately held companies based in Illinois